The 1969 New Mexico State Aggies football team was an American football team that represented New Mexico State University as an independent during the 1969 NCAA University Division football season.  In their second year under head coach Jim Wood, the Aggies compiled a 5–5 record and were outscored by a total of 235 to 199. The team played its home games at Memorial Stadium.

Schedule

References

New Mexico State
New Mexico State Aggies football seasons
New Mexico State Aggies football